Thomas Joseph 'T. J.' Gilmore (born 1949 in Cortoon, County Galway) is an Irish former sportsperson. He played Gaelic football with his local club Cortoon Shamrocks and was a member of the Galway senior inter-county team in the 1970s and 1980s.  Gilmore is a member of the set of Galway players who lost three All-Ireland finals in four years.

References

1949 births
Living people
Cortoon Shamrocks Gaelic footballers
Galway inter-county Gaelic footballers
Connacht inter-provincial Gaelic footballers